Bottom Points is a railway station on the Zig Zag Railway in the Blue Mountains area of New South Wales.

It is situated at the reversal point of the Lower and Middle Roads of the Lithgow Zig Zag.

When the Zig Zag Railway reopened in October 1975, Bottom Points was a terminal station on the line. It has a water crane at one end to replenish locomotives. The signal box was built in 1910 when the Ten Tunnels line opened, and was later relocated.

It is a five-minute walk from NSW TrainLink's Zig Zag station on the Main Western line.

References

Railway stations in Australia opened in 1975
Regional railway stations in New South Wales